Mon Louis is an unincorporated community on Mon Louis Island, in Mobile County, Alabama, United States.

History
Mon Louis is named for the nearby Mon Louis Island. The island was named by Nicholas Baudin, Sieur de Miragouin, in honor of his French native city Montlouis-sur-Loire. A post office operated under the name Mon Louis from 1890 to 1916.

Geography

References

Unincorporated communities in Alabama
Unincorporated communities in Mobile County, Alabama